This article shows the roster of all participating teams at the women's water polo tournament at the 2022 World Aquatics Championships.

Group A

The following is Canadian roster in the Water polo at the 2022 World Aquatics Championships – Women's tournament.

Head coach: David Paradelo

 
1 Jessica Gaudreault 
2 Kelly McKee 
3 Axelle Crevier 
4 Emma Wright 
5 Amanda Amorosa 
6 Gurpreet Sohi 
7 Verica Bakoc 
8 Rae Lekness 
9 Hayley McKelvey 
10 Kyra Christmas 
11 Kindred Paul 
12 Shae La Roche 
13 Clara Vulpisi

The following is Colombian roster in the Water polo at the 2022 World Aquatics Championships – Women's tournament.

Head coach: Bladimir Lopez Molina

 
1 Sara Agudelo 
2 Angela Rivera 
3 Valentina Restrepo 
4 Carolina Ortega Fuentes 
5 Antonia Caicedo Granada 
6 Juliana Atehortua Gil 
7 Daniela Marin Correa 
8 Carolina Lastre Palomeque 
9 Maria Jose Serna Quiroz 
10 Sara Vanegas Morales 
11 Susana Atehortua Gil 
12 Ana Maria Correa Vanegas 
13 Isabella Chamorro Vergara

The following is Hungarian roster in the Water polo at the 2022 World Aquatics Championships – Women's tournament.

Head coach: Attila Bíró

 
1 Edina Gangl 
2 Dorottya Szilágyi 
3 Vanda Vályi 
4 Gréta Gurisatti 
5 Zsuzsanna Máté 
6 Rebecca Parkes 
7 Géraldine Mahieu 
8 Rita Keszthelyi 
9 Dóra Leimeter 
10 Natasa Rybanska 
11 Kamilla Faragó 
12 Krisztina Garda 
13 Alda Magyari

The following is Italian roster in the Water polo at the 2022 World Aquatics Championships – Women's tournament.

Head coach: Carlo Silipo

 
1 Laura Teani 
2 Chiara Tabani 
3 Claudia Roberta Marletta 
4 Silvia Avegno 
5 Elisa Queirolo 
6 Sofia Giustini 
7 Domitilla Picozzi 
8 Roberta Bianconi 
9 Giulia Emmolo 
10 Valeria Palmieri 
11 Giuditta Galardi 
12 Giulia Viacava 
13 Caterina Banchelli

Group B

The following is Argentinian roster in the Water polo at the 2022 World Aquatics Championships – Women's tournament.

Head coach: Guillermo Setti

 
1 Nahir Stegmayer 
2 Lucia Ruiz Castellani 
3 Cecilia Leonard 
4 Ashley Hatcher 
5 Ludmila Ianni 
6 Julieta Auliel 
7 Lara Romano Maitena 
8 Carla Comba 
9 Isabel Riley 
10 Ana Agnesina 
11 Anahi Bacigalupo 
12 Dana Gerschcovsky 
13 Lola Canales

The following is Dutch roster in the Water polo at the 2022 World Aquatics Championships – Women's tournament.

Head coach: Evangelos Doudesis

 
1 Laura Aarts 
2 Iris Wolves 
3 Brigitte Sleeking 
4 Sabrina van der Sloot 
5 Lola Moolhuijzen 
6 Simone van de Kraats 
7 Rozanne Voorvelt 
8 Vivian Sevenich 
9 Kitty-Lynn Joustra 
10 Ilse Koolhaas 
11 Maxine Schaap 
12 Nina ten Broek 
13 Sarah Buis

The following is South African roster in the Water polo at the 2022 World Aquatics Championships – Women's tournament.

Head coach: Delaine Mentoor

 
1 Daniela Passoni 
2 Tumaini McDonell 
3 Paige Tancrel 
4 Anna Thornton-Dibb 
5 Iman Akomolafe 
6 Hanna Muller 
7 Shakira January 
8 Esihle Zondo 
9 Nicola Macleod 
10 Ruby Versfeld 
11 Ashleigh Vaughn 
12 Chloe Meecham 
13 Meghan Maartens

The following is American roster in the Water polo at the 2022 World Aquatics Championships – Women's tournament.

Head coach: Adam Krikorian

 
1 Ashleigh Johnson 
2 Maddie Musselman 
3 Tara Prentice 
4 Rachel Fattal 
5 Ava Elizabeth Johnson 
6 Maggie Steffens 
7 Stephania Haralabidis 
8 Ryann Neushul 
9 Denise Mammolito 
10 Kaleigh Gilchrist 
11 Bayley Weber 
12 Jordan Raney 
13 Amanda Longan

Group C

The following is Australian roster in the Water polo at the 2022 World Aquatics Championships – Women's tournament.

Head coach: Paul Oberman

 
1 Gabriella Palm 
2 Pascalle Casey 
3 Tenealle Fasala 
4 Bronte Halligan 
5 Bridget Leeson-Smith 
6 Abby Andrews 
7 Charlize Andrews 
8 Amy Ridge 
9 Zoe Arancini 
10 Lena Mihailovic 
11 Matilda Kearns 
12 Hayley Ballesty 
13 Genevieve Longman

The following is Brazilian roster in the Water polo at the 2022 World Aquatics Championships – Women's tournament.

Head coach: Frank Diaz

 
1 Thatiana Pregolini 
2 Alissa Pinciroli 
3 Mariane Cosmo 
4 Kemily Leão 
5 Jennifer Cavalcante 
6 Marcela Marrani 
7 Samantha Ferreira 
8 Luana Quinn 
9 Letícia Belorio 
10 Rebecca Moreir 
11 Mirella Coutinho 
12 Ana Julia Amaral 
13 Isabela Mendes

The following is Kazakhstani roster in the Water polo at the 2022 World Aquatics Championships – Women's tournament.

Head coach: Marat Naurazbekov

 
1 Alexandra Zharkimbayeva 
2 Darya Pochinok 
3 Valeriya Anossova 
4 Anna Turova 
5 Anastassiya Yeremina 
6 Darya Roga 
7 Anna Novikova 
8 Darya Muravyeva 
9 Nadezhda Shapovalova 
10 Viktoriya Khritankova 
11 Anastassiya Mirshina 
12 Anastassiya Murataliyeva 
13 Mariya Martynenko

The following is  New Zealand  roster in the Water polo at the 2022 World Aquatics Championships – Women's tournament.

Head coach:  Angela Winstanley-Smith

 
1 Jessica Milicich 
2 Emily Nicholson 
3 Bernadette Doyle 
4 Elizabeth Gault 
5 Gabrielle Milicich 
6 Morgan McDowall 
7 Emmerson Houghton 
8 Katie McKenty 
9 Sophie Shorter-Robinson 
10 Gabriella MacDonald 
11 Malia Josephson 
12 Millie Quin 
13 Bridget Layburn

Group D

The following is French roster in the Water polo at the 2022 World Aquatics Championships – Women's tournament.

Head coach:  Émilien Bugeaud

 
1 Chloé Vidal 
2 Estelle Millot 
3 Gabrielle Fitaire 
4 Camelia Bouloukbachi 
5 Louise Guillet 
6 Kahena Benlekbir 
7 Juliette Dhalluin 
8 Aurelie Battu 
9 Ema Vernoux 
10 Viviane Bahia 
11 Camille Radosavljevic 
12 Audrey Daule 
13 Anne Collas

The following is Greek roster in the Water polo at the 2022 World Aquatics Championships – Women's tournament.

Head coach:  Alexia Kammenou

 
1 Ioanna Stamatopoulou 
2 Eleftheria Plevritou 
3 Ioanna Chydirioti 
4 Eleni Elliniadi 
5 Margarita Plevritou 
6 Eleni Xenaki 
7 Eirini Ninou 
8 Maria Patra 
9 Christina Siouti 
10 Vasiliki Plevritou 
11 Athina Dimitra Giannopoulou 
12 Maria Myriokefalitaki 
13 Eleni Sotireli

The following is Spanish roster in the Water polo at the 2022 World Aquatics Championships – Women's tournament.

Head coach:  Miki Oca

 
1 Laura Ester 
2 Cristina Nogue Frigola 
3 Anni Espar 
4 Beatriz Ortiz 
5 Nona Perez Vivas 
6 Irene González 
7 Elena Ruiz 
8 Pili Peña 
9 Judith Forca 
10 Paula Camus 
11 Maica García Godoy 
12 Paula Leitón 
13 Martina Terre

The following is Thai roster in the Water polo at the 2022 World Aquatics Championships – Women's tournament.

Head coach:   Natalya Rustamova

 
1 Napason Mouksung 
2 Thanidakarn Kwantongtanaree 
3 Poonnada Rotchanarut 
4 Wataniya Nilklad 
5 Nattamon Khamma 
6 Kornkarn Puengpongsakul 
7 Kritsana Puangtong 
8 Benyakorn Khunprathum 
9 Raksina Rueangsappaisan 
10 Issaree Turon 
11 Yanisa Turon 
12 Panchita Rodwattanadisakul 
13 Phanthila Arsayuth

References

External links
Official website
Records and statistics (reports by Omega)

World Aquatics Championships water polo squads
Women's team rosters